Melanie Rawn (born 1954) is an American author of fantasy literature. She received a BA in history from Scripps College and worked as a teacher and editor before becoming a writer.

She has been nominated for a Locus award on three occasions: in 1989 for Dragon Prince in the first novel category, in 1994 for Skybowl in the fantasy novel category, and again in 1995 for Ruins of Ambrai in the fantasy novel category. The third novel in the "Exiles" trilogy has now been "forthcoming" since the late 1990s due to the author suffering from clinical depression and moving on to other projects to facilitate her recovery. In 2014, Rawn stated via Kate Elliot's blog that she intended to complete the trilogy after finishing the fifth book of the Glass Thorns series.

Bibliography

Dragon Prince trilogy
Dragon Prince, 1988
The Star Scroll, 1989
Sunrunner's Fire, 1990

Dragon Star trilogy
Stronghold, 1991
The Dragon Token, 1993
Skybowl, 1994

The Golden Key universe
The Golden Key, 1996 (with Kate Elliott and Jennifer Roberson)
The Diviner, 2011 (prequel to The Golden Key)

Exiles trilogy
The Ruins of Ambrai, 1994
The Mageborn Traitor, 1997
The Captal's Tower (planned)

Spellbinder
Spellbinder: A Love Story with Magical Interruptions, 2006
Fire Raiser, 2009

Glass Thorns
Touchstone, 2012
Elsewhens, 2013
Thornlost, 2014
Window Wall, 2015
Playing to the Gods, 2017

Stand-alone
The Rushden Legacy, 1985 (as Ellen Randolph)
Knights of the Morningstar, 1994, Quantum Leap tie-in novel

Short stories
Salve, Regina in Return to Avalon (Roberson; 1995 DAW)
The Lady's Gift in Ancient Enchantresses  (Massie-Ferch, Greenberg, Gilliam; 1995 DAW)
Of the Death of Kings in Warrior Enchantresses  (Maisse-Ferch, Greenberg; 1996 DAW)
The Abbot of Croxton in Highwaymen: Robbers & Rogues  (Roberson; 1997 DAW)
There Goes the Neighborhood in Return of the Dinosaurs  (Resnick, Greenberg; 1997 DAW)
The Sacrifice in Fantasy: DAW 30th Anniversary  (Gilbert, Wollheim; 2002 DAW)
Mother of All Russiya in Lightspeed, May 2012  (Adams; 2012 Lightspeed Magazine)

References

External links
 Interview with Melanie Rawn at SFFWorld.com
 

1954 births
20th-century American novelists
21st-century American novelists
American fantasy writers
American women short story writers
American short story writers
American women novelists
Dragon Prince series
Living people
 
Scripps College alumni
Women science fiction and fantasy writers
20th-century American women writers
21st-century American women writers